Quandary Peak is the highest summit of the Tenmile Range in the Rocky Mountains of North America and is the most commonly climbed fourteener in Colorado. It has nearly the same elevation as Castle Peak and Mount Evans.

Hence it is a popular fourteener to climb because of the relatively easy ascent and its proximity to Denver and Breckenridge. Quandary Peak is also popular with backcountry skiers and snowboarders. The gentle ascent makes for an easy climb from the east with less danger from avalanche than on many other fourteeners. The other slopes of the peak are steep and appeal to expert backcountry skiers.
One such steep ski mountaineering route is the Cristo Couloir.

In June 2021 the Colorado Fourteeners Initiative announced that Quandary Peak was Colorado's most popular 14'er in 2020. The Initiative's data indicated that the peak saw 49,179 hiker days in 2020. Its popularity in recent years has caused serious parking problems at the trailheads, prompting local officials to initiate new parking policies.

See also

List of mountain peaks of Colorado
List of Colorado fourteeners

References

External links

 
 

Mountains of Colorado
Mountains of Summit County, Colorado
Fourteeners of Colorado
North American 4000 m summits